is a Japanese professional footballer who plays as a midfielder for Renofa Yamaguchi FC.

References

External links

1999 births
Living people
Japanese footballers
Association football defenders
Japan youth international footballers
Kashiwa Reysol players
Renofa Yamaguchi FC players
J2 League players